Daminah al-Sharqiyah is a village in central Syria, administratively part of the Homs Governorate, south of Homs. Nearby localities include Shinshar to the northeast, al-Buwaida al-Sharqiya to the northwest and al-Qusayr to the southwest. According to the Central Bureau of Statistics, Daminah al-Sharqiyah had a population of 1,893 in the 2004 census.

In 1838 Daminah al-Sharqiyah was classified as an abandoned village by English scholar Eli Smith.

References

Bibliography

Populated places in al-Qusayr District